Meryteti ("loved by Teti") served as vizier of Pepi I during the Sixth Dynasty of Egypt. He was the son of the vizier Mereruka. His mother was the royal daughter Seshseshet Waatetkhethor, daughter of Teti. He was thus a nephew of the king Pepi I Meryre.

Tomb
Meryteti was buried in the mastaba of his father Mereruka. This tomb was divided into three sections. The largest part of the mastaba was made for Mereruka, another section belonged to Mereruka's mother, while the third part belonged to Meryteti. The burial shaft of Meryteti is located in the north-west corner of Mereruka's tomb. His section of the tomb depicts his own wife, Nebet, and two sons, Ihyemsaef (or Ihy) and Niankhmin.

References

Viziers of the Sixth Dynasty of Egypt